Jean Barrez (14 March 1886 – 10 April 1967) was a French painter. His work was part of the painting event in the art competition at the 1928 Summer Olympics under the pseudonym Joe Bridge.

References

External links
 

1886 births
1967 deaths
20th-century French painters
20th-century French male artists
French male painters
Olympic competitors in art competitions
Artists from New York City
19th-century French male artists